Oktyabrsky District is an administrative and municipal district (raion), one of the twenty-eight in Kursk Oblast, Russia. It is located in the center of the oblast. Its administrative center is the urban locality (a work settlement) of Pryamitsyno. Population:  23,877 (2002 Census);  The population of Pryamitsyno accounts for 22.4% of the district's total population.

Geography
Oktyabrsky District is located in the central region of Kursk Oblast.  The terrain is hilly plain on
the Central Russian Upland.  The main river in the district is the Seym River (which from the district flows west to the Dnieper basin) and the Bolshaya Kuritsa, a minor tributary of the Seym.  The district is 10 km west of the city of Kursk and 460 km southwest of Moscow.  The area measures 40 km (north-south), and 15 km (west-east).  The administrative center is the town of Pryamitsyno.

The district is bordered on the north by Fatezhsky District, on the east by Kursky District, on the south by Medvensky District, and on the west by Kurchatovsky District.

References

Notes

Sources

External links
Oktyabrsky District on Google Maps
Oktyabrsky District on OpenStreetMap

Districts of Kursk Oblast